The Journal of Democracy is a quarterly academic journal established in 1990 and an official publication of the National Endowment for Democracy's International Forum for Democratic Studies. It covers the study of democracy, democratic regimes, and pro-democracy movements throughout the world.

In addition to scholarly research and analysis, the journal incorporates reports from activists on the ground, updates on elections, and reviews of recent literature in the field. Writers published in the journal have included Václav Havel, the Dalai Lama, and Zbigniew Brzezinski. The journal is published by the Johns Hopkins University Press.

The editors of the Journal of Democracy commission most articles but do consider unsolicited articles. The journal does not perform peer review.

According to the Journal Citation Reports, the journal has a 4.663 impact factor as of 2021.

See also
 Democratization

References

External links
 
 Journal of Democracy on the Johns Hopkins University Press website
 Journal of Democracy at Project MUSE

Political science journals
Johns Hopkins University Press academic journals
English-language journals
Publications established in 1990
Quarterly journals
National Endowment for Democracy